Maldeikis is a Lithuanian surname. Notable people with the surname include:
Eugenijus Maldeikis (born 1958), Lithuanian politician, former husband of Aušra, father of Matas
Aušra Maldeikienė (born 1958), Lithuanian politician, former wife of Eugenijus, mother of Matas 
Matas Maldeikis (born 1980), Lithuanian politician, son of Eugenijus and Aušra

Lithuanian-language surnames